Iran crisis may refer to

Iran crisis of 1946
Iran hostage crisis
2009 Iranian election protests
2017–18 Iranian protests